Elvedin Provalić (born 22 July 1973) is a Bosnian retired football player.

International career
Provalić made 2 appearances for Bosnia and Herzegovina, in a March 2000 double bill away against Jordan.

Post-playing career
After retiring as a player, he worked in the private sector. In October 2020 he was candidate for the Democratic Front at the Visoko City Council elections.

References

External links

1973 births
Living people
People from Visoko
Association football defenders
Bosnia and Herzegovina footballers
Bosnia and Herzegovina international footballers
NK Bosna Visoko players
FK Rudar Kakanj players
Premier League of Bosnia and Herzegovina players
First League of the Federation of Bosnia and Herzegovina players